The Doctor Television Channel, also known as Doctor TV (stylized as DrTV), was a healthy lifestyle digital television network in the United States. Doctor TV was primarily affiliated with the digital subchannels of television stations owned and/or operated by DTV America Corporation, as well as a handful of other station groups. The channel's headquarters were most recently located at 1511 S Chestnut St in Lufkin, Texas.

History
Doctor TV started broadcasting on January 6, 2014, having signed affiliation agreements with television stations in 93 markets, with the majority of those stations being owned by DTV America Corporation. The first stations included KLKW-LD in Amarillo, Texas; WCZU-LD in Bowling Green, Kentucky; WYJJ-LD in Jackson, Tennessee; KNKC-LD in Lubbock, Texas; WGPS-LP in Fort Myers, Florida; and KAJL-LD in Fayetteville, Arkansas. KGPT-CD in Wichita, Kansas was the first non-DTV America-operated station to sign one of its subchannels with Doctor TV in fall 2014. In the first quarter of 2015, WCKV-LD in Clarksville, Tennessee and KPVM-LP in Pahrump, Nevada signed on Doctor TV-affiliated subchannels.

In January 2018, the network was sold to Captender LLC with master control moved to Lufkin, Texas. The network's social media ceased being updated shortly after the sale. By the end of 2019, all of the network's stations had disaffiliated from the network and its online feed had ceased operating.

Programming
Doctor TV's schedule consisted of programming with healthcare information from medical professionals, as well as shows promoting healthy eating and physical fitness. The network also broadcast “health minutes,” which were one-minute-long spots that gave the viewer health advice in a varied topic. This format was somewhat similar to that of the also-defunct Live Well Network. Four and a half hours of children's educational programming was provided on Saturday and Sunday mornings, making a total of 9 hours of FCC-mandated children's educational programming, triple the 3 hour minimum.

Doctor TV also offered classic public domain movies from 8:00 to 10:00 p.m. ET (7 to 9 p.m. CT) on Saturday and Sunday nights, and from 12:00 to 2:00 a.m. ET (11 p.m. to 1 a.m. CT). From 2:00 to 4:30 a.m. ET (1 to 3:30 a.m. CT), Doctor TV provided programming from the now-also-defunct The Worship Network under the title “Music for Meditation.”

Former programming
Faithful Workouts
Just Down the Road

Availability

Online and streaming
In addition to its over-the-air affiliates, Doctor TV could also be viewed worldwide by using their live network stream at their website. Doctor TV was also available on the Roku Digital media receiver, making it available to all users of that device.

Former affiliates

References

External links

Doctor TV - Official Website
DRTV Channel on Facebook
DTV America - largest group of DrTV affiliates

Television channels and stations established in 2014
Television channels and stations disestablished in 2019
Television networks in the United States
Defunct television networks in the United States
2014 establishments in the United States
2019 disestablishments in the United States
Television channels and networks about health
English-language television stations in the United States